A song book, or songbook, is a book containing lyrics and notes for songs.

Songbook may also refer to:

Albums 
 Songbook (Angela Aki album), 2012
 Songbook (Benny Carter album), 1996
 Songbook (Goran Bregović album), 2000
 Songbook (Chris Cornell album), 2011
 Songbook (Family of the Year album), 2009
 Songbook (Gordon Lightfoot album), 1999
 Songbook (Katie Noonan album), 2013
 Songbook (Kenny Garrett album), 1997
 Songbook (The Nudie Suits album), 2003
 Songbook (Robbie Williams album), 2009
 Songbook (Woodpigeon album), 2006
 Songbook: The Singles, Vol. 1, by Super Furry Animals
 (Songbook) A Collection of Hits, by Trisha Yearwood
 Song Book, an album by Burl Ives
 Songbook #1, an album by The Vicar (music producer)

Other media 
 Songbook (Nick Hornby book) (UK title: 31 Songs), a 2002 collection of essays
 Songbook (musical), a 1979 musical by Monty Norman and Julian Moore, also known as The Moony Shapiro Songbook
 Song Books (Cage), a collection of short works by John Cage

See also
 Bob Andy's Song Book, an album
 Rattlesnake Guitar: The Music of Peter Green, reissued as Peter Green Songbook, a Peter Green tribute album -->